Mohammad Rizwan (Urdu, ; born 1 June 1992) is a Pakistani international cricketer who has represented Pakistan in international cricket since 2015 and captains Pakistan Super League (PSL) franchise Multan Sultans. 

Rizwan is the only batter to score 2000 runs in a calendar year in T20s.  He is a right-handed batter and wicket-keeper and has scored centuries in all three international formats: Tests, One Day Internationals and Twenty20 Internationals. He is the vice-captain of the Pakistan cricket team in Test cricket. He was one of the Wisden Cricketers of the Year in 2021. He was also the ICC Men's T20I Cricketer of the Year 2021. He also led the Multan Sultans to victory in the Pakistan Super League 2021. Mohammad Rizwan is the leading run scorer in T20 International in a calendar year with 1326 runs in 26 innings at an average of 73.66.
 
He played for Lahore Qalandars in the Pakistan Super League from 2016 to 2017, for Karachi Kings from 2018 to 2020, and currently captains Multan Sultans. He captains Khyber Pakhtunkhwa in domestic cricket.

Domestic career
Playing for Sui Northern Gas Pipelines Limited in the final of the Quaid-e-Azam Trophy in 2014–15, Rizwan scored 224 to help Sui Northern to a 301-run first-innings lead and their second title. He kept wicket for Pakistan A in the five limited-overs matches against Kenya in December 2014.

In April 2018, he was named the vice-captain of Punjab's squad for the 2018 Pakistan Cup. On 1 May 2018, he scored his highest total in List A cricket, with 140 off 123 balls against Federal Areas. In March 2019, he was named as the captain of Federal Areas squad for the 2019 Pakistan Cup.

In September 2019, Rizwan was named as the captain of Khyber Pakhtunkhwa for the 2019–20 Quaid-e-Azam Trophy tournament. In October 2019, he was named the player of the tournament in the 2019–20 National T20 Cup, for scoring 215 runs and taking six wickets.

He was retained by Khyber Pakhtunkhwa for the 2020–21 domestic season, both as player and captain of the team.

In February 2021, Multan Sultans announced Rizwan as their captain replacing Shan Masood ahead of PSL 6. 

In June 2021 he led Multan Sultans to their first PSL title, and was awarded wicket-Keeper of the tournament.

In December 2021, he was signed by Sussex to play County Championship and T20 cricket in 2022.

In February 2023, while playing for Multan Sultans against Karachi Kings in PSL 8, he hit his second T20 century and his first PSL century, an unbeaten 110 off 64 deliveries at the Multan Cricket Stadium.

International career
Rizwan made his One Day International (ODI) debut for Pakistan against Bangladesh in April 2015, scoring 67 runs off 58 balls. He made his Twenty20 International debut for Pakistan in the same series. He made his Test debut for Pakistan against New Zealand on 25 November 2016. He was out for a golden duck in his maiden Test innings.

In August 2018 he was one 33 players awarded a central contract for the 2018–19 season by the Pakistan Cricket Board (PCB). He captained Pakistan's team in the 2018 ACC Emerging Teams Asia Cup. Pakistan reached the semi-finals. In March 2019, during the second ODI against Australia, Rizwan scored his first century in an ODI match, making 115 runs.

In November 2019, Rizwan was recalled to the Pakistan team against Sri Lanka. He was also selected against Australia later that month, where in the first innings of the First Test it was debated as to whether he was given out on a no ball. In the second innings he made 95.

In June 2020, he was named in a 29-man squad for Pakistan's tour to England during the COVID-19 pandemic. However, on 23 June 2020, Rizwan was one of seven players from Pakistan's squad to test positive for COVID-19. In July, he was shortlisted in Pakistan's 20-man squad for the Test matches against England. He had an excellent Test series, both with the bat and gloves, managing to score 161 runs with two-half centuries, therefore, cementing his place as first choice wicket-keeper in Test matches, above the returning former captain Sarfaraz Ahmed. He was named as Pakistan's player of the Test series.

In December 2020, Rizwan was named as the captain of Pakistan's Test side for the first match against New Zealand. He replaced Babar Azam, after he was ruled out due to an earlier injury. In the same tour, he was also added to Pakistan's T20I squad against New Zealand. In the 3rd T20I of the series against New Zealand, Rizwan scored his career-best T20I score of 89 to give Pakistan a win and saved them from getting white-washed by New Zealand.

In February 2021, in Pakistan's series against South Africa, Rizwan scored his first century in Test cricket, with an unbeaten 115 as he was awarded the player of the series. In February 2021, in Pakistan's series against South Africa, Rizwan scored his first century in T20I cricket, with an unbeaten 104 including 6 boundaries and 7 sixes. He also became the first wicket-keeper batter for Pakistan to score a century in T20I cricket and became only the second wicketkeeper batter after Brendon McCullum to score centuries in all three formats of international cricket. He also became only the second Pakistani batter to score a century in T20I cricket after Ahmed Shehzad and also became the fifth designated wicketkeeper batter to notch a T20I century.

In April 2021, during the third T20I between Pakistan and South Africa he along with Babar Azam made 197 run partnership for the opening wicket which is also the highest partnership recorded by a pair for Pakistan for any wicket in T20I cricket. It was also the highest ever partnership for any wicket by a pair in T20I cricket while chasing. In September 2021, he was named in Pakistan's squad for the 2021 ICC Men's T20 World Cup. In December 2021, in the third match against the West Indies, Rizwan became the first batter to score 2,000 runs in Twenty20 cricket in a calendar year. In September 2022, Rizwan and Babar scored a record T20 cricket partnership of 203 without being dismissed.

Awards
 PCB's Most Valuable Cricketer of the Year for 2021
 PCB's T20I Cricketer of the Year for 2021
 Named in ICC Men's T20I Team of the Year for 2021
 Wisden Cricketers of the Year for 2021
 ICC Men's T20I Cricketer of the Year for 2021
 Named in ICC Men's T20I Team of the Year for 2022

References

External links
 

1992 births
Living people
Pakistani cricketers
Pakistan Test cricketers
Pakistan One Day International cricketers
Pakistan Twenty20 International cricketers
Khyber Pakhtunkhwa cricketers
Peshawar cricketers
Sui Northern Gas Pipelines Limited cricketers
Sussex cricketers
Cricketers from Peshawar
Pashtun people
Lahore Qalandars cricketers
Karachi Kings cricketers
Sylhet Strikers cricketers
Wisden Cricketers of the Year
Wicket-keepers